Rascalize is the debut album by rock band The Rascals. 
Recorded with producer Ben Hillier (The Horrors, Blur, Elbow) in London, released through Deltasonic.

The album was released on 23 June 2008 (first released on iTunes on 15 June 2008). It debuted and peaked at No. 100 on the UK Albums Chart dropping out of the charts the following week.

Singles
"Freakbeat Phantom" (16 June 2008, Deltasonic)
"I'll Give You Sympathy" (29 September 2008, Deltasonic)

Track listing

Personnel
Miles Kane – vocals, guitar
Greg Mighall – drums
Joe Edwards – bass
Ben Hillier – producer

Charts

References

2008 debut albums
Albums produced by Ben Hillier
The Rascals (English band) albums